Rashk-e Sofla (also Romanized as Rāshk-e Soflá; also known as Rāshk and Rāshk-e Pā’īn) is a village in Sornabad Rural District, Hamaijan District, Sepidan County, Fars Province, Iran. At the 2006 census, its population was 428, in 106 families.

References 

Populated places in Sepidan County